P. R. Sundaram is an Indian politician.

Sundaram is a former Member of the Legislative Assembly of Tamil Nadu. He was elected to the Tamil Nadu legislative assembly as an Anna Dravida Munnetra Kazhagam candidate from Rasipuram constituency in the 1996 and 2001 elections.

Sundaram was elected to the Lok Sabha representing Namakkal in the 2014 elections.

References 

All India Anna Dravida Munnetra Kazhagam politicians
Living people
Tamil Nadu MLAs 1996–2001
Tamil Nadu MLAs 2001–2006
India MPs 2014–2019
Lok Sabha members from Tamil Nadu
People from Namakkal district
1951 births